Didsbury/Minty Field Aerodrome  is located  west of Didsbury, Alberta, Canada.

References

External links
Page about this airport on COPA's Places to Fly airport directory

Registered aerodromes in Alberta
Mountain View County